William Henry Harrison High School, also known as Evansville Harrison High School, is a public high school on the east side of Evansville, Indiana. Students at Harrison come from the Plaza Park Middle School and McGary Middle School.

Harrison High School opened in September, 1962. The school was named for William Henry Harrison, the ninth President of the United States.

Sports

Also see: Sports in Evansville

State titles

 Girls' golf (1988–89)
 Boys' golf (2011–12)

Notable alumni
Michael Barber, music producer and rapper
 Sean Bennett, NFL football player
 Brad Brownell, Clemson University men's basketball head coach
 Calbert Cheaney, NBA basketball player and coach
 Joey Elliott, quarterback for Purdue Boilermakers football and CFL's Winnipeg Blue Bombers, BC Lions and Ottawa RedBlacks
 Brad Ellsworth, former U.S. Representative from Indiana's 8th congressional district
 Kevin Hardy, former Illinois Fighting Illini football player and NFL Pro Bowl linebacker for Jacksonville Jaguars, Dallas Cowboys and Cincinnati Bengals
 Barbara Kinney, White House photographer, Clinton Administration
 Chris Lowery, former Southern Illinois Salukis men's basketball head coach; assistant coach of Kansas State Wildcats men's basketball team
 Walter McCarty, former Kentucky Wildcats men's basketball player and for NBA's New York Knicks, Boston Celtics, Phoenix Suns and Los Angeles Clippers; assistant coach for Boston Celtics. Former Head Coach of University of Evansville Men's Basketball team.
 Steven Sater, Tony Award-winning poet and playwright
 Randall Shepard, Chief Justice Indiana State Supreme Court
 Jami Stallings, 2003 Miss Indiana Teen USA, 2007 Miss Indiana USA
 Casey Stegall, correspondent for Fox News
 Scott Studwell, NFL football player
 Andy Timmons, guitarist
 Brandon Gaudin, sports broadcaster. Voice of Madden NFL. Broadcaster for Fox Sports, Westwood One and Big Ten Network.

See also
 List of high schools in Indiana

References

External links
 Evansville Harrison High School

 

Public high schools in Indiana
High schools in Southwestern Indiana
Southern Indiana Athletic Conference
Schools in Evansville, Indiana
1962 establishments in Indiana
Educational institutions established in 1962